William "Bill" Jude Doré (born 1942) is an American businessman and political donor.

Personal life and education
Dore was born in a small town in Southern Louisiana called New Iberia. He is the oldest of five children and is the son of Elaine Therese (née Ackal) Doré, a Cajun, and Advance "Eddie" Doré, a second-generation Lebanese immigrant.

Dore attended McNeese State University on a track and field scholarship; he studied Education and earned a Bachelor's and master's degree in 1966.

Dore and his wife Kay split their time between Lake Charles, Louisiana and Mountain Brook, Alabama.

Career
Dore's career began as an insurance salesman while he was attending college. After college Dore moved to New Orleans, earning real estate and securities licenses. Dore bought into a rental company, eventually turning the company into Global Industries, Ltd., an oil and gas company.

Dore retired as CEO of Global Industries, Ltd. in 2006, and as chairman of the board of directors in 2007. He has previously served on the board of Founders Advisors, a Birmingham, Alabama based merger, acquisition & strategic advisory firm.

Political activities
Dore was a major supporter of Rick Santorum's 2012 presidential campaign, donating $2.25 million to the Red, White and Blue Fund, Santorum's Super PAC. Dore has given money to both Democrats and Republicans, supporting Bobby Jindal, Charles Boustany, and Mary Landrieu.

Scholarship program 
Doré established the Horatio Alger Louisiana Scholarship Program through the Horatio Alger Association of Distinguished Americans and has donated more than $7 million for Louisiana scholarships. The Horatio Alger Association of Distinguished Americans awarded him the Horatio Alger Award in 2000.

References

Living people
1942 births
People from New Iberia, Louisiana
People from Lake Charles, Louisiana
People from Mountain Brook, Alabama
McNeese State University alumni